Nicholas Leonard Skorich (June 26, 1921 – October 2, 2004) was an American football player and coach.

Skorich played guard at Bellaire High School and the University of Cincinnati before joining the United States Navy in 1943. After the end of World War II, he signed with the Pittsburgh Steelers, who had taken him in the 1943 NFL Draft. He played three years for the Steelers.

Skorich then went into coaching, first at the high school level, then as an assistant with the Steelers from 1954 to 1957. After one year with the Green Bay Packers, he moved to the Philadelphia Eagles, who promoted him to head coach after Buck Shaw retired following the Eagles' 1960 championship season.

The Eagles remained competitive in 1961, winning 10 of 14 games, but fell to 3–10–1 in 1962 and 2–10–2 in 1963. Fired from the Eagles, Skorich took a job as a defensive assistant under Cleveland Browns coach Blanton Collier in 1964. The Browns promoted him to offensive coordinator four years later and head coach on January 7, 1971 upon Collier's retirement after the 1970 season.

In 1970, the Browns had gone 7–7 in only their second non-winning season since beginning play in 1946. Under Skorich, the Browns went 9–5 in 1971, winning the AFC Central Division before losing to the Baltimore Colts in the divisional playoffs. The following year, the Browns earned a wild card spot with a 10–4 record. In the playoffs, they came as close as anyone else that season did to beating the Miami Dolphins in that team's perfect season, losing 20–14 on a late Jim Kiick touchdown.

But by then Browns greats like Leroy Kelly, Gary Collins and Gene Hickerson had retired or were winding down their careers, and quarterback Mike Phipps was proving to be a disappointment. Cleveland dropped to 7–5–2 in 1973 and, in its first last-place finish ever, 4–10 in 1974. The Browns replaced Skorich with former Green Bay Packers star Forrest Gregg. Several players drafted under Skorich, including Brian Sipe, Doug Dieken and Greg Pruitt would play well for Gregg and his successor, Sam Rutigliano.

After leaving Cleveland, Skorich served as supervisor of officials for the National Football League.  He is credited with developing mechanics for umpires, the most demanding position on an officiating crew since the umpire is positioned behind the defensive line and is often caught in the middle of heavy traffic during play. The mechanics for umpires was changed by the NFL for the 2010 season, moving the umpire behind the quarterback, parallel to the referee, except for the last two minutes of each half.

He died in 2004, after complications from heart surgery.  In his memory his family started the Nicholas L. Skorich scholarship fund, which, holds a yearly golf outing.

References

External links
 Nicholas Skorich Scholarship Fund
 
"Upbringing served Skorich well" by Steve King, Clevelandbrowns.com, October 4, 2004, retrieved December 8, 2005.

Bibliography
Carroll, Bob, et al. (1999). Total Football II. New York: HarperCollins. .

1921 births
2004 deaths
American football guards
Cincinnati Bearcats football players
Cleveland Browns coaches
Green Bay Packers coaches
Philadelphia Eagles coaches
Pittsburgh Steelers coaches
Pittsburgh Steelers players
RPI Engineers football coaches
High school football coaches in Pennsylvania
United States Navy personnel of World War II
United States Navy officers
People from Bellaire, Ohio
Players of American football from Ohio
Cleveland Browns head coaches
Philadelphia Eagles head coaches